Naphthazarin, often called 5,8-dihydroxy-1,4-naphthoquinone or 5,8-dihydroxy-1,4-naphthalenedione (IUPAC), is a naturally occurring organic compound with formula , formally derived from 1,4-naphthoquinone through replacement of two hydrogen atoms by hydroxyl (OH) groups.  It is thus one of many dihydroxynaphthoquinone structural isomers.

Naphthazarin is soluble in 1,4-dioxane from which it crystallizes as deep red needles that melt at 228−232 °C.

Synthesis 
Naphtharazin can be prepared by condensation of 1,4-dimethoxybenzene with 2,3-dichloromaleic anhydride followed by reductive dechlorination and reoxidation.

Naphtharazin can also be obtained by oxidation of 5,8-dihydroxy-1-tetralone with manganese dioxide (MnO2).

References 

1,4-Naphthoquinones
Hydroquinones
Hydroxynaphthoquinones
3-Hydroxypropenals within hydroxyquinones